Solamen is a genus of saltwater, brackish water and freshwater clams, marine bivalve molluscs in the subfamily Crenellinae of the family Mytilidae, the mussels.

Species
 Solamen bulla (Dunker, 1857)
 Solamen columbianum (Dall, 1897)
 Solamen dollfusi (Dautzenberg, 1910)
 Solamen glandula (Totten, 1834)
 Solamen leanum (Dall, 1897)
 Solamen megas (Dall, 1902)
 Solamen persicum (E. A. Smith, 1906)
 Solamen recens (Tate, 1897)
 Solamen spectabile (A. Adams, 1862)
 Solamen striatissimum (G. B. Sowerby III, 1904)

References

 Coan, E. V.; Valentich-Scott, P. (2012). Bivalve seashells of tropical West America. Marine bivalve mollusks from Baja California to northern Peru. 2 vols, 1258 pp

External links
 Iredale, T. (1924). Results from Roy Bell's molluscan collections. Proceedings of the Linnean Society of New South Wales. 49(3): 179-278.

Mytilidae
Bivalve genera